This is a list of films which have placed number one at the weekend box office in Spain during 2010.

Highest-grossing films

See also
 List of Spanish films — Spanish films by year

References

2010
Box
Spain